Livadia ( []) is a municipality and suburb of Larnaca.  It has been a settlement since the middle bronze age.

References

Municipalities in Larnaca District